Johnny Seymour (8 October 1896 Escanaba, Michigan – 27 February 1958 South Bend, Indiana) was an American racecar driver. Before the First World War, he raced motorcycles, and he toured Australia as a motorcycle racer in the winter of 1924–25. Seymour started racing cars in 1927. He suffered serious burns in a 1939 crash in Indianapolis.

Indy 500 results

Notes

1896 births
1958 deaths
People from Escanaba, Michigan
Indianapolis 500 drivers
Racing drivers from Michigan